The War Merit Cross was a military decoration of the Principality of Reuss.  Established 23 May 1915 by Fürst Heinrich XXVII the Cross was presented to all ranks for distinguished conduct in combat.

References

Military awards and decorations of Imperial Germany
Orders, decorations, and medals of Reuss
Principality of Reuss-Greiz